The Premio Federico Tesio is a Group 2 flat horse race in Italy open to thoroughbreds aged three years or older. It is run at Milan over a distance of 2,200 metres (about 1 mile and 3 furlongs), and it is scheduled to take place each year in September.

History
The event is named after Federico Tesio (1869–1954), one of the most successful horse breeders in the sport's history.

The race was given Group 2 status in the 1970s. It was cut from 2,200 to 1,800 metres in 1985. It was relegated to Group 3 and restored to 2,200 metres in 1988.

The Premio Federico Tesio was promoted back to Group 2 level in 2011. It was cut from 2,200 to 2,000 metres in 2020.

Records
Most successful horse since 1975 (3 wins):
 Voila Ici – 2008, 2009, 2010

Leading jockey since 1987 (6 wins):
 Mirco Demuro – Noel (1999), Voila Ici (2008, 2009, 2010), Sneak a Peek (2011), Orsino (2012)

Leading trainer since 1987:
 Stefano Botti, six wins - Sneak a Peek (2011), Biz the Nurse (2013), Dylan Mouth (2014, 2015), Full Drago (2016, 2017)
 Vittorio Caruso, five wins – Misil (1993), Slicious (1996), Voila Ici (2008, 2009, 2010)

Winners since 1987

Earlier winners

 1975: Veio
 1976: Gallio
 1977: Stateff
 1978: Stone
 1979: Laostic
 1980: Marmolada
 1981: Nemr
 1982: Haul Knight
 1983: My Top
 1984: Alan Ford
 1985: King of Clubs
 1986: Big Reef

See also
 List of Italian flat horse races

References
 Racing Post:

Horse races in Italy
Open middle distance horse races
Sport in Milan